Pape-Alioune Ndiaye (born 4 February 1998) is a French footballer who plays as a centre-back for Austrian Bundesliga club Rheindorf Altach.

Career

Early years
Ndiaye started his career in the youth department of Boulogne-Billancourt and was signed to the youth teams of Caen, playing alongside future talents such as Yann Karamoh and Jean-Victor Makengo before joining Valenciennes at 15-years-old.

In the Valenciennes academy, Ndiaye played alongside Dayot Upamecano, a player to whom he remained close to throughout his career. It was at the same time as the latter that he left Valencienne in 2016, who were in financial turmoil. While Upamecano left for RB Leipzig, Ndiaye joined Auxerre, where he only played for a few months before joining Italian club Bologna. At the Serie A club, he played with the U19s and also practices with the first team under the leadership of Roberto Donadoni. Ndiaye later stated, that he became the victim of player agents wanting to turn his development into profit, instead of focusing on naturally growing his talent. It was in this light that he joined Bari in Serie B.

Lorca Deportiva
Having changed agents after his difficult stint in Italy, Ndiaye moved to Segunda División B club Lorca Deportiva in 2017, where he would go on to make his senior debut. He put in several good performances during his first season, mainly as a defensive midfielder.

Ndiaye scored his first senior goal on 5 November 2017 in a match against San Fernando — a spectacular strike from outside the box. However, Lorca would end up suffering relegation to the fourth division. At the end of the season, he terminated his contract by mutual consent.

Suddenly a free agent, Ndiaye suffered a metatarsal injury that put his career on hold for more than nine months.

Vorskla Poltava
In the summer of 2019, Ndiaye went on a trial with Ukrainian club Vorskla Poltava, where he was signed. He would flourish in the Ukrainian Premier League, especially from 2020, where he establishes himself as a mainstay at centre-back. Most notably, he would perform well in a victory against champions Shakhtar Donetsk, inflicting their only defeat of the season.

During the 2020–21 season, Ndiaye continued in great form and attracted the interest of several foreign clubs, including as West Ham United, Lille, Braga and Beşiktaş.

He was also awarded the title of best defender of the first half of the season, where Vorskla were among the best teams in the league behind Shakhtar and Dynamo Kyiv, while his contract would expire in the summer of 2021.

Rheindorf Altach
After the 2020–21 season Ndiaye left Poltava, whereupon he signed a two-year contract with Austrian Football Bundesliga club Rheindorf Altach in August 2021.

Personal life 
Born in France, Ndiaye is of Senegalese descent. Pape is the brother of Moulaye N'Diaye, a former member of PSG and Crystal Palace academies who played in Belgian Second Division and for Truro City.

Career statistics

References

1998 births
Living people
AC Boulogne-Billancourt players
AJ Auxerre players
Association football defenders
Austrian Football Bundesliga players
Austrian Landesliga players
Austrian Regionalliga players
Bologna F.C. 1909 players
Expatriate footballers in Austria
Expatriate footballers in Italy
Expatriate footballers in Spain
Expatriate footballers in Ukraine
FC Vorskla Poltava players
Footballers from Hauts-de-Seine
French expatriate footballers
French expatriate sportspeople in Austria
French expatriate sportspeople in Italy
French expatriate sportspeople in Spain
French expatriate sportspeople in Ukraine
French footballers
French sportspeople of Senegalese descent
People from Nanterre
S.S.C. Bari players
SC Rheindorf Altach players
Segunda División B players
Stade Malherbe Caen players
Ukrainian Premier League players
Valenciennes FC players